Galerina patagonica is a species of agaric fungus in the family Hymenogastraceae. First described by mycologist Rolf Singer in 1953, it has a Gondwanan distribution, and is found in Australia, New Zealand, and Patagonia (South America), where it grows on rotting wood.

The fungus contains a laccase enzyme that has been investigated for possible used in bioremediation of chlorophenol-polluted environments.

The toxicity of Galerina patagonica is unknown. However, it's phylogenetically nested within the Galerina marginata species complex, and thus likely contains deadly amatoxins.

References

External links

Hymenogastraceae
Fungi described in 1954
Fungi of Australia
Fungi of New Zealand
Fungi of South America
Taxa named by Rolf Singer